is a loose anime adaptation of the role-playing game Fate/Extra produced by Shaft and aired from January 28 until July 29, 2018. Part of the Fate franchise by game studio Type-Moon, it was directed by Akiyuki Shinbo and Yukihiro Miyamoto with Kinoko Nasu and Hikaru Sakurai writing for the series's scripts. Masaaki Takiyama and Hiroki Yamamura (Shaft) designed the characters and served as chief animation directors, and Satoru Kōsaki composed the music. Riki Matsuura, Kousuke Murayama, and Rina Iwamoto (CUES) were the main animators.

Episode list

Notes

References

Fate Extra Last Encore
Lists of Fate/stay night episodes